The Grand Secretariat, or the Cabinet (Vietnamese: Nội các, 內閣) of the Nguyễn dynasty, was the highest branch of its government until the 1930s. Its functions were to serve at the pleasure of the emperor. The Grand Secretariat consisted of four senior officials and 28 employees who served as secretaries, readers, and recorders and worked for almost the imperial government's documents and affairs. 

The senior officials were Thượng bảo tào, Biểu bạ tào, Bí thư tào and Ký chú tào.

During the reign of the emperor Gia Long (1802–1819), the cabinet comprised 3 secretaries: Thị Thư Viện, Thị Hàn viện and Nội Hàn Viện. In 1820, emperor Minh Mạng dissolved the three secretaries, incorporated them into the new organ called Văn thư phòng–the predecessor of the Nội các. However, the Văn thư phòng did not function as a legislature branch of the imperial court until 1829, when Minh Mạng reorganized it to become the Nội các.

References 

 Work cited

 
  

 

Government of the Nguyễn dynasty